Phragmocapnias is a genus of fungi in the family Capnodiaceae.

Species
Phragmocapnias asiaticus 
Phragmocapnias betle 
Phragmocapnias callitris 
Phragmocapnias heliconiae 
Phragmocapnias imperspicua 
Phragmocapnias longicolla 
Phragmocapnias penzigii 
Phragmocapnias plumeriae 
Phragmocapnias siamensis

References

Capnodiaceae
Dothideomycetes genera
Taxa named by Ferdinand Theissen
Taxa named by Hans Sydow
Taxa described in 1918